Philip Hellquist (born 21 May 1991), is a Swedish footballer who plays as a forward for Brommapojkarna.

Career
Hellquist grew up in the Stockholm suburb Kista, and began playing football in Djurgården's youth team at the age of five. He was named for the Swedish U17 national team in a friendly against Latvia in April 2007. The game was his debut in any of the Swedish national teams, and he also scored the last goal in the 6–0 victory. He drew attention from English club Arsenal, which offered him a place in their U17-team. No transfer was made due to a hip injury. Hellquist also had a trial at Birmingham City and Italian club Empoli showed interest in him. He began playing with the senior team during the 2008 pre-season. He played his first game in Svenska Cupen in the 4–2 loss against IK Sirius, and also scored his first goal in the Cup. Hellquist made his Allsvenskan debut on 2 July 2008 against Elfsborg as a substitute. Djurgården awarded him "Junior player of the year" for his achievements during the 2008 season. He extended his contract with Djurgården for an additional three years in March 2010.

On 15 January 2014, he signed a contract with Austrian team SC Wiener Neustadt.

On 9 June 2015, he signed a contract with Austrian team Wolfsberger AC.

On 7 August 2017, he signed a six months contract with Swedish team Kalmar.

On 9 February 2018, he signed a contract with Greek team PAS Giannina.

In March 2021, he joined KuPS in Finland.

On 10 August 2021, Hellquist returned to Brommapojkarna and signed a contract until the end of 2022.

Career statistics

References

External links
 
 
 

1991 births
Living people
Footballers from Stockholm
Swedish footballers
Swedish expatriate footballers
Sweden under-21 international footballers
Sweden youth international footballers
Djurgårdens IF Fotboll players
Vasalunds IF players
Assyriska FF players
Wolfsberger AC players
Kalmar FF players
IF Brommapojkarna players
PAS Giannina F.C. players
Chungnam Asan FC players
Kuopion Palloseura players
Allsvenskan players
Superettan players
Austrian Football Bundesliga players
Super League Greece players
K League 2 players
Veikkausliiga players
Kakkonen players
Swedish expatriate sportspeople in Austria
Swedish expatriate sportspeople in Greece
Swedish expatriates in South Korea
Swedish expatriate sportspeople in Finland
Expatriate footballers in Austria
Expatriate footballers in Greece
Expatriate footballers in South Korea
Expatriate footballers in Finland
Association football midfielders